Lachesilla sauteri is a species of Psocoptera from the Lachesillidae family that is endemic to Switzerland.

References

Lachesillidae
Insects described in 1977
Endemic fauna of Switzerland
Psocoptera of Europe